The 2021 W Series Austin round was the seventh and final showdown of the 2021 W Series, and took place at the Circuit of the Americas in the United States on the 23rd and 24 October 2021. The event was an undercard to the 2021 Formula One World Championship round at the same circuit.

Report

Background
The championship was originally scheduled to hold two events in the Americas, one at the Circuit of the Americas and another at the Autódromo Hermanos Rodríguez in support of the 2021 Mexico City Grand Prix – however due to calendar changes for Formula One, W Series opted to hold just the one event in Austin but add a second race to their support billing. Two practice sessions would be held with only one qualifying session, where a drivers' fastest time set the grid positions for race one and her second fastest time set her grid position for race two.

Prior to the event, it was confirmed that the top eight drivers in the standings at seasons' end would be guaranteed entry into the 2022 season. The championship also announced a series of breast cancer prevention initiatives for the Austin round in response to Breast Cancer Awareness Month.

Russian driver Irina Sidorkova was denied a visa to the United States and was forced to miss the event; she was replaced with Caitlin Wood.

Alice Powell and Jamie Chadwick both led the championship on 109 points, however Powell was mathematically ahead with three wins to Chadwick’s two.

Race 1
Abbi Pulling scored a shock pole in just her third W Series outing but the young Brit lost out at the start as Emma Kimiläinen rounded up both drivers on the front row and shot to the lead, however a slow exit from the first corner allowed Jamie Chadwick to take the lead ahead of Pulling. Belén García had qualified third but a grid penalty put her back to sixth; the disadvantage was quickly wiped out as she went around the outside of both Kimiläinen and Pulling at turn two, the Finn using García as a slingshot to re-pass Pulling back up into the podium places as the field swept into the esses. Fabienne Wohlwend and Alice Powell both made solid progress on the opening lap as well, each gaining three places up into 6th and 7th respectively.

After Belén García's rapid start, the Spaniard began to form a train of cars behind – Kimiläinen attempted a move into turn 11, forcing the Scuderia W car offline and the Écurie W driver dragged her way past down the back straight. Pulling and Sarah Moore attempted moves behind, however had to settle for a little while longer. Powell, whose disastrous qualifying had placed her firmly on the back foot in the championship fight, made it a four-car battle for the podium as Pulling slid down the inside at the final corner. Powell used the move to pass Moore into turn 1 before taking García at turn 12, however had lost significant ground on her protégé Pulling.

Abbie Eaton started the weekend on the back foot having qualifying 14th for both races, and after falling to 16th at the start her weekend ended prematurely when she fractured her T4 vertebrae in a collision with a sausage kerb on the exit of turn 16. Wohlwend's good start also fell apart as her tyres began to degrade as a result of a spin in Practice 2 – the Liechtensteiner falling back to 10th. Ahead of her, Beitske Visser got past Marta García in a three-car battle for seventh that included Jessica Hawkins.

Belén García's pace had deteriorated exponentially heading into the closing stages as the leaders pulled away from her fifth place at the rate of 2 seconds per lap. Nerea Martí was recovering from the worst qualifying of her rookie season by passing Wohlwend for the final point, whilst Hawkins passed Marta García ahead for eighth – and signalled her displeasure with the Spaniard's defence as she went past on the back straight. Moore, fed up with her team-mate's lack of pace, sent it down the inside of Belén García at turn 1 with eight minutes to go, Visser following closely behind. Half a lap later García ran wide on the exit of turn 11 under some pressure from Hawkins and lost out to the Brit – however when Marta García tried to make the move at turn 12 she applied too much throttle and spun out on her own, dropping a long way out of the points. Belén García soon suffered a similar fate; Martí, Wohlwend and Koyama all sailing past the Catalan to drop her out of the points.

Having disposed of her team-mate, Sarah Moore now found herself fighting Visser for the top five. A difficult season for the 2019 runner-up had left her with only two points finishes in six races, but the Dutchwoman soared past Moore at turn 12 to equal her best result of the season. At the front, Powell had steadily closed on Pulling in the Puma car – and a track limits warning for Pulling curtailed her pace even further. On the final lap of the race, Powell dived up the inside of Pulling at turn 11 to seal the bottom step of the podium and clawed back another three points in the championship hunt.

Jamie Chadwick took a lights-to-flag victory with Kimiläinen second. Powell's third place left her ten points down on Chadwick, and with the Veloce Racing driver starting 9 places ahead in the final race she had one hand firmly on the championship trophy.

Race 2
The grid was reduced to sixteen cars for the last race of the season – Abbie Eaton was hospitalised with a compound fracture and Marta García withdrew citing mental health concerns.

Chadwick rocketed away from pole position and took a comfortable lead into turn 1. Sarah Moore had a terrible start from third and slipped back into the midfield, and the two Bunker Racing cars went side-by-side – Fabienne Wohlwend was forced wide over the sausage kerbs, bouncing across them in a similar fashion to Eaton the day before but was unharmed. Alice Powell passed her team-mate for seventh as she attempted to stay in the championship hunt.

Kimiläinen was no longer in the championship fight and was guaranteed third in the standings, but that didn't stop her from seizing third from Beitske Visser at turn 11. The Dutchwoman was only just hanging onto a top eight place and attempted to re-pass at the end of the straight but the Finn defended stoutly. Visser's team-mate and Texan resident Ayla Ågren made her way past Bruna Tomaselli for twelfth, the Brazilian had a strong start after issues in qualifying saw her start last for both races.

Sabré Cook engaged in a battle with Hawkins over eighth; the only American in the field had failed to score a point in any of the races and was keen to impress on home soil. She passed Hawkins at turn 16 and chased down Powell, who was stuck behind Belén García. Moore attempted a pass on Visser at turn 1; the move was initially countered by the M. Forbes Motorsport driver, however the Brit made the pass stick a lap later. Wohlwend had suffered a cracked suspension wishbone in her first lap off, and having valiantly held onto a place just outside the points for more than half the race the damage proved too much of a problem and she chose to retire the car.

With Chadwick in a comfortable lead, Powell's chances of winning the championship were becoming increasingly difficult – the Brit used the hurry up from Cook to send one down the inside of García at turn 1, but ran wide and was re-passed. Cook was held up by the move and Hawkins, desperate to try and climb into the championship top eight, attempted to capitalise – but she made a half-hearted move on the American at turn 12 that spun both drivers around 180° and out of the points. Powell finally made the move stick on García with just four minutes remaining, forcing the Spaniard out wide and taking sixth.

Powell's efforts were in vain however as Chadwick cruised to her fourth win of the season and sealed the title by 27 points. Abbi Pulling capped off a breakthrough weekend by finishing second and Kimiläinen drove a quiet race to third. Nerea Martí finished the season as the highest placed rookie in fourth despite two eighth-place finishes in the last round; Moore, Wohlwend, Pulling and Visser securing the remaining spots in the top eight. Irina Sidorkova's absence saw her drop outside the cut-off by 4 points, however as an Academy driver she was contracted to a second season regardless.

Classification

Practice

Qualifying

 – Belén García received a three-place grid penalty for impeding another competitor in qualifying.

Race 1

Race 2

Championship standings

See also
 2021 United States Grand Prix

Notes

References

External links
 Official website
 Race 1 replay
 Race 2 replay

|- style="text-align:center"
|width="35%"|Previous race:
|width="30%"|W Series2021 season
|width="40%"|Next race:

W Series Austin
W Series Austin
Austin
W Series Austin